Chars is a commune in the Val-d'Oise department in Île-de-France in northern France.

Education
Chars has a single preschool, école maternelle des Tournesols, and a single elementary school, ecole elementaire de chars.

There is a vocational high school, Lycée professionnel régional du Vexin.

See also
Communes of the Val-d'Oise department

References

External links
Home page 

Association of Mayors of the Val d'Oise 

Communes of Val-d'Oise